Holger Wehlage (born 3 July 1976) is a German former professional footballer who played as a midfielder.

Honours
Werder Bremen
 Bundesliga: 2004
 DFB-Pokal: 2004

References

External links
 
 Holger Wehlage Interview

Living people
1976 births
People from Meppen
Footballers from Lower Saxony
German footballers
Association football midfielders
SV Meppen players
VfB Lübeck players
FC St. Pauli players
SV Werder Bremen players
1. FC Union Berlin players
MSV Duisburg players
Rot-Weiss Essen players
Eintracht Braunschweig players
Bundesliga players
2. Bundesliga players
3. Liga players
West German footballers